Victoria Dillard (born September 20, 1967) is an American advocate for Parkinson's disease research. She is also a former television and film actress who is best known for her co-starring roles as Janelle Cooper in the ABC sitcom Spin City, as one of the royal bathers in the 1988 Eddie Murphy romantic comedy Coming to America, and as the wife of Denzel Washington's main character in the 1991 action thriller film Ricochet.

Life and career
Dillard was born in New York City. She began performing at the age of five with the Dance Theatre of Harlem. She worked with the company until she was eighteen, appearing in such productions Porgy and Bess at the Metropolitan Opera. Then she went on tour in A Funny Thing Happened on the Way to the Forum with Mickey Rooney.

Dillard's most notable television role was as Janelle Cooper in the ABC sitcom Spin City. She stayed on the show for four seasons before leaving in 2000. Her other television credits include Star Trek: The Next Generation, Seinfeld, Roc, L.A. Law, Chicago Hope, Martin, Moesha, Family Law, Law & Order, Law & Order: Criminal Intent and other series.

Some of her film credits are Coming to America (1988), Deep Cover (1992), The Glass Shield (1994), Internal Affairs (1990), Out-of-Sync (1995) with LL Cool J, and Ricochet (1991) with Denzel Washington. Dillard also appeared as Betty Shabazz in the 2001 film Ali, her last film to date.

Dillard was featured in the November 1988 Playboy issue in the article "Sex In Cinema 1988", referencing her brief topless appearance in the beginning of Coming to America.

Personal life
Dillard currently lives in New York City. She dances in her free time and writes screenplays and plays for the stage. Dillard was dating actor Laurence Fishburne beginning in 1992 when the two met on the set of the film Deep Cover. Their relationship ended in 1995.

In 2005, at the age of 38, Dillard was diagnosed with Parkinson's disease. It is the same disease that afflicts her former Spin City co-star, actor Michael J. Fox. She has since become an advocate for Parkinson's disease research and treatments.

Filmography

Film

Television

References

External links

1967 births
20th-century American actresses
21st-century American actresses
Actresses from New York City
African-American actresses
American female dancers
American dancers
American film actresses
American stage actresses
American television actresses
Living people
Dancers from New York (state)
20th-century African-American women
20th-century African-American people
21st-century African-American women
21st-century African-American people
People with Parkinson's disease